Hiroshima 1st district (広島県第1区, Hiroshima-ken dai-ikku or 広島1区, Hiroshima ikku) is a single-member constituency of the House of Representatives, the lower house of the national Diet of Japan. It is located in Hiroshima. As of September 1, 2020, 331,786 eligible voters were registered in the district.

This constituency was newly established in 1994 from the former 1st district. The previous constituency elected two or more people, but this constituency elects only one person.

Fumio Kishida, Prime Minister of Japan, has represented this district since October 1996.

List of the members representing the district

Election results

2021

2017

2014

2012

2009

2005

2003

2000

Notes

References 

Hiroshima Prefecture
Districts of the House of Representatives (Japan)
Hiroshima